Loredana is a feminine given name, claimed to be invented by French author Lucile Aurore Dupin (George Sand) in her novel Mattea (1833), and later used by  Luciano Zuccoli in L'amore di Loredana (1908). 
It may have been inspired by the real-life Venetian surname Loredan, itself from the toponym Loreo, Veneto, which originated from its Latin name Lauretum, meaning laurel. It is a common name in Italy and Romania. There is a related version without the opening letter l, Oredana, because is wrongly perceveid as an article (L'Oredana) and thus removed. The name may refer to:

 Loredana (actress) (1924–2016), Italian actress
Loredana Bertè (born 1950), Italian singer
Loredana Boboc, Romanian gymnast
Loredana De Petris (born 1957), Italian politician
Loredana Dinu, Romanian épée fencer 
Loredana Errore, Romanian-born Italian singer
Loredana Groza, Romanian singer
Loredana Lanzani (born 1965), Italian-American mathematician
Loredana Marcello (died 1572), Dogaressa of Venice 
Loredana Toma, Romanian female weightlifter
Loredana Zefi, Swiss rapper

References

Romanian feminine given names
Italian feminine given names